The Respected Comrade Supreme Commander Is Our Destiny is a 2008 North Korean film, described by the North Korean State news agency KCNA as a "documentary film".

It was screened at the People's Palace of Culture in Pyongyang in August 2008 for the 48th anniversary of Kim Jong-il's first steps in his Songun revolution leadership, and aimed at celebrating him as the author of the policy. Selected spectators included Party, army and state officials, as well as "officials of working people's organizations" and of "national institutions".

KCNA published the following review:

References

External links

2008 films
Documentary films about politics
2000s Korean-language films
North Korean documentary films
Cultural depictions of Kim Jong-il